Colgate Theatre is a 30-minute dramatic television anthology series telecast on NBC during 1949, returning during 1958, for a total of 50 episodes in two different formats.

The first edition, a live television anthology, was telecast on Monday nights from January 1949 to October 1949 at 9 p.m. ET and on Sunday nights at 8:30 p.m. ET from October 1949 to June 1950.

The second series airing on Tuesdays at 9:30 p.m. ET consisted of filmed television pilots of unsold series, and was a last-minute replacement for the quiz show Dotto, which ended August 12, 1958 due to accusations that it was rigged. Colgate Theatre served as a filler for the sponsor until The George Burns Show premiered on October 14, 1958. Bill Goodwin was host for the 1958 series.

Critical reception
A review in the trade publication Variety described the presentation of "The Haunting Years" on January 10, 1949, as being "completely devoid of quality". It said that the episode "was supposed to be a gag of cosmic proportions but it turned out to be only a kindergarten romp", adding that all involved in the production were "victimized by the script".

Selected Episodes
Mr. and Mrs. North (July 4, 1949)
Vic and Sade: Part 1 (July 11, 1949)
Vic and Sade: Part 2 (July 18, 1949)
Vic and Sade: Part 3 (July 25, 1949)
O'Brien (November 13, 1949)
The Pearls (December 18, 1949)
Adventures of a Model (August 19, 1958)
The Last Marshal, starring James Craig (August 26, 1958)
Tonight in Havana (September 2, 1958)
Strange Counsel [Mr. Tutt] (September 9, 1958)
The Fountain of Youth (September 16, 1958) directed by Orson Welles
MacGreedy's Woman (September 23, 1958)
Welcome to Washington/The Claudette Colbert Show (September 30, 1958) written by Inez Asher
If You Knew Tomorrow (October 7, 1958)

Notable guest stars
Walter Brennan
Claudette Colbert
Joanne Dru
Vera Miles
Ricardo Montalbán
Jane Russell
Mary Wickes

See also
1949-50 United States network television schedule
1957-58 United States network television schedule
1958-59 United States network television schedule
Colgate Comedy Hour (1950–55) aka Colgate Variety Hour

References

External links
 
 

1949 American television series debuts
1958 American television series endings
1940s American anthology television series
1950s American anthology television series
Black-and-white American television shows
NBC original programming
American live television series